Asma Khader (25 January 1952 – 20 December 2021) was a lawyer, devoted feminist, women's rights and human rights activist and a Jordanian politician. She served as the first governments spokesperson in Jordan, a Minister of Culture from 2004 to 2005, and a member of the Senate from 2014 to 2015. Khader died from pancreatic cancer on 20 December 2021, at the age of 69 in Amman.

References

1952 births
2021 deaths
People from Amman
Culture ministers of Jordan
Members of the Senate of Jordan
Jordanian people of Palestinian descent